Golconda Patrika was a Telugu-language journal.The Founder and editor was Suravaram Pratap Reddy.

History
The journal started in 10 May 1926  It was a journal in Hyderabad State. 

Many of his articles appeared in journals like Sujata, Shoba, Bharati etc.

Closure
The publication of this patrika was stopped in 1967.

References

Telugu-language newspapers